The Big Fight is a 1972 Taiwanese film.

References

External links 

1972 films
1972 action films
1970s Mandarin-language films
Hong Kong action films
1970s Hong Kong films